The Catamarca class consisted of two destroyers built for the Argentine Navy during the 1910s in Germany because Argentina lacked the industrial facilities needed to build them. Completed in 1912, the sister ships were initially assigned duties as training ships.  spent much of her career as a flotilla leader while  spent more time in reserve or on training duties. They remained in service until 1947 when they were placed in reserve. The ships were stricken from the navy list in 1956 and sold for scrap in 1959–1960.

Design and description
The Catamarca-class ships were ordered in 1910 as part of a program of a dozen destroyers, two pairs from German shipyards, and four each from Britain and France. The ships had to be ordered from foreign shipyards because Argentina lacked the facilities to build warships of that size itself. The German-built ships were the only ones delivered as the British-built destroyers were sold to the Royal Hellenic Navy in 1912; the French ships were still under construction when World War I began in August 1914 and were purchased by the French Navy. They were powered by two Curtis-AEG steam turbines, each driving one propeller shaft using steam provided by two mixed-firing Thornycroft-Schulz boilers that used both coal and fuel oil.

The main armament of the Catamarca class consisted of four 50-caliber  guns in single mounts. One gun was located on the forecastle, another between the rear and center funnels and the final pair before and after of the rear superstructure. The ships were also armed with four 21-inch (533 mm) torpedo tubes on rotating single mounts, two on each broadside amidships. The ships' complement consisted of 150 officers and men.

Ships

Citations

Sources
 Arguindeguy, Pablo E. Apuntes sobre los buques de la Armada Argentina (1810–1970). Comando en Jefe de la Armada, Buenos Aires, 1972.  

 
Destroyers of the Argentine Navy